A. punctulata may refer to:
 Aethalura punctulata, the grey birch, a moth species found in Europe
 Arbacia punctulata, a sea urchin species